Suberic acid, also octanedioic acid, is a dicarboxylic acid, with formula C8H14O4. It is a colorless crystalline solid used in drug syntheses and plastics manufacture. Its name is derived from the Latin word suber which means cork.

References

Dicarboxylic acids